The Katy Trail State Park is a state park in the U.S. state of Missouri that contains the Katy Trail, the country's longest continuous recreational rail trail. It runs , largely along the northern bank of the Missouri River, in the right-of-way of the former Missouri–Kansas–Texas Railroad. Open year-round from sunrise to sunset, it serves hikers, joggers, and cyclists. Its hard, flat surface is of "limestone pug" (crushed limestone).

The nickname "Katy" comes from the phonetic pronunciation of "KT", a short form of the railroad's abbreviated name, MKT. Sections of the Katy are also part of the Lewis and Clark National Historic Trail and the American Discovery Trail.

History
Conversion of right-of-way to a trail was made possible by the National Trails System Act of 1968. In 1982, the city of Columbia opened the MKT Trail on an abandoned spur of the Katy as one of the first rails-to-trails pilot projects in the United States.

On October 4, 1986, floodwater from the Missouri River severely damaged the track along the Missouri–Kansas–Texas Railroad's route from Sedalia to Machens, Missouri. The route had been washed out and repaired many times, but this time, railroad officials decided not to return the tracks to service. Trains were re-routed, and the right-of-way was to be abandoned.  The Missouri Department of Natural Resources purchased the right-of-way with a donation from Edward D. "Ted" Jones and Pat Jones of Williamsburg and St. Louis. In 1990, the first segment of the trail officially opened in Rocheport.

In 1991, the Union Pacific Railroad donated  of right-of-way from Sedalia to Clinton.

The trail was initially planned for completion in 1994. However, the Great Flood of 1993 damaged  of the original  of the trail. The completed trail from St. Charles to Sedalia was finally opened in 1996; the section from Sedalia to Clinton opened in 1999.

In 2011, the trail was expanded to include the corridor from St. Charles to Machens.

Trail networks 
A new section of trail on the Rock Island railroad corridor opened in December 2016.  The Rock Island Spur starts at Windsor, on the Katy Trail, and runs 47 miles northwest towards Kansas City. The trail, originally slated to be named Rock Island Trail State Park, extends the trail system to the suburbs of Kansas City at Pleasant Hill on rail banked right-of-way of the Chicago, Rock Island and Pacific Railroad.

A settlement to allow the use of this portion of the Rock Island corridor was reached between Missouri Governor Matt Blunt and Ameren as partial compensation for a flood which devastated Johnson's Shut-ins State Park after the failure of a dam owned by Ameren.

Efforts are being made to extend that trail from Pleasant Hill further into the center of the Kansas City metro area. A six-mile segment of that trail opened in the Lee's Summit area in 2019.

Plans are underway to add another  unused section of the Chicago, Rock Island and Pacific to Rock Island Trail State Park, which, with the Katy, would create a  trail network.

The extension would run from Windsor to Beaufort, near Washington.  Preliminary plans are to then extend the trail into Washington from where it could cross the Missouri River to connect to the Katy Trail again, completing a cross-state loop.

A "quad state" proposal would connect the Katy and other existing trails in Missouri, Kansas, Iowa, and Nebraska.

Route
The Katy Trail currently begins at Machens (mile-marker 27) on the Missouri River and runs along the northern bank of the river for most of the trail's length. The next major city along the trail is Jefferson City — the state capital. At mile-marker 169.9 (McBaine) the trail intersects the MKT Trail, which leads into downtown Columbia, the largest city along the trail. The Katy then deviates from its original path and crosses the Missouri River at Boonville on the Boonslick Bridge instead of the original MKT Bridge. From here the trail runs to its terminus in Clinton at mile-marker 264.6.

Issues

The MKT bridge at Boonville

The Katy Trail is part of the U.S. railbank, which means it must remain connected to the national railway network so that it could be returned to active railway use. The segment of the trail between St. Charles and Sedalia was connected in two locations. One of these connections is in St. Charles and the other was provided by the Missouri–Kansas–Texas Bridge at Boonville. The Missouri Department of Natural Resources was granted the right to keep the bridge in place and to use it at the MDNR's discretion as part of the trail under the Interim Trail Agreement of June 25, 1987. But on April 28, 2005, the Missouri Department of Natural Resources amended the agreement, abandoning its rights to the bridge and allowing Union Pacific to remove the bridge and thus creating two independent segments in the trail, east and west of Boonville. If the connection in St. Charles is destroyed or otherwise rendered unusable by rail (such as by natural disaster), the segment of the trail between St. Charles and Boonville would lose its railbanked status and ownership of the land would probably revert to its original owners from before the MKT Line was built. The same could happen to the segment east of Boonville if its connection is lost.

On February 4, 2010, Missouri Governor Jay Nixon announced that Union Pacific Railroad would give the bridge to the city of Boonville, ending a nearly six-year dispute over the bridge and the trail.  The city announced it would restore the bridge and incorporate it back into the Katy Trail bicycle and hiking trail.

References

External links

Katy Trail State Park Missouri Department of Natural Resources
Katy Trail State Park TrailLink by Rails to Trail Conservancy
The Katy Trail RailsToTrails.us
Katy Trail Map (user generated)

American Discovery Trail
Bike paths in Missouri
Hiking trails in Missouri
Long-distance trails in the United States
Missouri–Kansas–Texas Railroad
Rail trails in Missouri
State parks of Missouri
Protected areas of Callaway County, Missouri
Protected areas of Warren County, Missouri
Protected areas of St. Charles County, Missouri
Protected areas of Montgomery County, Missouri
Protected areas of Boone County, Missouri
Protected areas of Howard County, Missouri
Protected areas of Cooper County, Missouri
Protected areas of Pettis County, Missouri
Protected areas of Henry County, Missouri